Dominic Scott Kay (born May 6, 1996) is an American inactive former child actor, entrepreneur and singer.

He is best known for his work as the voice of Wilbur in Charlotte's Web, and in the post-credits scene of Pirates of the Caribbean: At World's End as Henry Turner, the son of Will Turner (Orlando Bloom) and Elizabeth Swann (Keira Knightley). He also played Tom Cruise's son in Steven Spielberg's Minority Report, and Adam in Snow Buddies. He also appeared on season five of the American edition of The Voice.

Kay directed and wrote a short film starring Kevin Bacon called Saving Angelo, a story based on the true events of an abandoned dog left for dead on the side of the road that he and his family rescued in 2003. He also wrote and directed another short film, Grandpa's Cabin.

Kay is an entrepreneur, owning multiple entertainment companies. He is known as a fond animal-lover, and currently serves as a StarPower Ambassador for Starlight Children's Foundation.

Filmography

Awards and nominations

References

External links

Dominic Scott Kay at Hollywood.com

1996 births
Living people
21st-century American male actors
American male child actors
American male film actors
American male television actors
American male voice actors
Male actors from Los Angeles
People from California
The Voice (franchise) contestants